The Haskell Invitational Stakes, run at  Monmouth Park with a purse of $1 million, is the one of the richest invitational event contested in North America. Each year the race presents a very prestigious horseracing trophy called the Haskell Invitational Trophy along with its hefty purse.

Description of trophy 

The trophy is made of four distinct segments, three of which are gold- and silver-plated. The first and most forwardly placed segment of the trophy shows three gold thoroughbreds (each approximately 3 inches tall and 5 inches long) running down the stretch toward the finish line. The second segment forms the 14-inch backdrop of the trophy; it is that of the familiar Monmouth Park Arches logo also in gold and silver plate. It is surrounded by the third portion of the trophy, four 15-inch gold-plated festival flags on the top of silver-plated flag poles. The flags were specifically chosen to help portray the festival atmosphere of the New Jersey beach track's signature event. The fourth and final segment of the trophy is a 5-inch-thick wood base shaped in a racing oval made of polished mahogany, it is faced with a 4-inch-tall silver plate engraved with the connections of the winner. The race name, year, distance and time are at the top to identify the race but the name of the horse, the owner, the trainer and the jockey are all inscribed on the plate.

History of trophy's namesake 

The Haskell Invitational Handicap has marked its 42nd renewal of the race named for the first president and chairman of the Monmouth Park Jockey Club, Amory Lawrence Haskell. As a tribute to the man honored by this race, Amory L. Haskell's daughters, Hope Haskell-Jones and Anne Haskell-Ellis, present the Haskell Invitational Trophy each year. Amory L. Haskell was born in New York City in 1893. He worked at General Motors for many years and then left to form Triplex Safety Glass Company and was president and chairman of the board when he sold it. Haskell then organized a group of prominent New Jersey residents to build a modern Thoroughbred racetrack in Monmouth County. Appointed president and chairman of Monmouth Park Jockey Club in 1945, he guided that organization through its opening in 1946 and continued at the helm until his death on April 12, 1966.

Changes in race 

In 1968, the Monmouth Park directors honored his memory with the Amory L. Haskell Handicap, a race for older horses. In 1981, the Haskell name was transferred to a mile and an eighth invitational for the nation's top three-year-olds. In 1983, Monmouth Park's Board of Directors commissioned a trophy to be awarded each year that would be worthy of the high esteem that the race had garnered.

References

Horse racing in the United States
Horse racing awards
American horse racing trophies
Monmouth Park Racetrack